Thousand Roads is the third solo studio album by the rock artist David Crosby, a founding member of Crosby, Stills, and Nash. It was released in 1993 on Atlantic Records.

Track listing

B-sides

Personnel 
 David Crosby – lead and backing vocals
 Phil Collins – keyboards (1), drums (1), percussion (1), backing vocals (1)
 Benmont Tench – keyboards (2)
 Jimmy Webb – acoustic piano (2)
 Marc Cohn – acoustic piano (3)
 Craig Doerge – keyboards (4, 8, 9), arrangements (9)
 C.J. Vanston – keyboards (4, 5, 8, 10)
 Paul Wickens – keyboards (7), accordion (7)
 Bonnie Hayes – keyboards (9)
 Jeff Pevar – guitars (1)
 Michael Landau – electric guitar (2)
 Bernie Leadon – electric guitar (2, 9), acoustic guitar (2, 4, 6, 7, 8)
 John Leventhal – guitars (3)
 Dean Parks – guitars (5, 10), flute (5)
 Andy Fairweather Low – electric guitar (6, 7)
 Ethan Johns – additional electric guitar (6), drums (6, 7), percussion (6, 7)
 Pino Palladino – bass (1)
 Leland Sklar – bass (2-5, 8-10)
 David Watkins Clarke – bass (6, 7)
 Jim Keltner – drums (2)
 Jeff Porcaro – drums (4, 8)
 Russ Kunkel – drums (9, 10)
 Paulinho da Costa – percussion (4, 8)
 Luis Conte – percussion (5)
 Jackson Browne – harmony vocals (2)
 Graham Nash – harmony vocals (2, 3), harmonica (3)
 Kipp Lennon – harmony vocals (4, 8, 9, 10)
 Stephen Bishop – harmony vocals (10)

Strings on "Helpless Heart"
 David Campbell – arrangements
 Armen Garabedian – concertmaster 
 Suzie Katayama – contractor 
 David Young – string bass
 Larry Corbett, Suzie Katayama and Daniel Smith – cello
 Scott Haupert, Maria Newman and Evan Wilson – viola
 Armen Garabedian, Berj Garabedian, Ruth Johnson and Dimitrie Levici – violin

Production 
 Producers – Phil Collins (Track 1); Don Was (Tracks 2, 4 & 8); David Crosby (Tracks 3, 5 & 9); John Leventhal (Track 3); Dean Parks (Track 5); Glyn Johns (Tracks 6 & 7); Phil Ramone (Track 10).
 Co-Producers – Nick Davis (Track 1); Stephen Barncard (Track 9).
 Executive Producer – Jan Crosby
 Engineers – Nick Davis (Track 1); Rob Eaton (guitar overdub, Track 1); Rik Pekkonen (Tracks 2, 4 & 8); Paul Dieter (Tracks 3, 5 & 10); Glyn Johns (Tracks 6 & 7); Stephen Barncard and Ed Goodreau (Track 9).
 Assistant Engineers – Simon Metcalfe (Track 1); Dan Bosworth (Tracks 2, 4 & 8); Steve Onsuka (Track 5); Bob Salcedo (Tracks 5 & 10); Mike Kloster (Track 9).
 Mastered by Doug Sax at The Mastering Lab (Hollywood, CA).
 Art Direction – Graham Nash
 Cover Art – R. Mac Holbert
 Photography – Guido Harari

References

1993 albums
Albums produced by Phil Ramone
Albums produced by Don Was
Albums produced by Glyn Johns
Albums produced by Phil Collins
Albums produced by Stephen Barncard
Atlantic Records albums
Albums recorded at Groove Masters Studios